Charles Edmund Nash (May 23, 1844 – June 21, 1913) was an American politician who served a single two-year term as Republican in the United States House of Representatives from Louisiana.

He was Louisiana's first African-American congressman and would remain the state's only black U.S. Representative for more than a century — until 1991, when William J. Jefferson's tenure in the 2nd Louisiana District began.

Early life and education
Nash was born in Opelousas (the seat of St. Landry Parish) in southern Louisiana. He attended the common schools and was a bricklayer by trade.

Career
During the American Civil War, he enlisted in 1863 as a private in the Eighty-second Regiment, United States Volunteers, and was promoted to the rank of sergeant major. (This regiment is listed in the U.S. Colored Troops in the Mobile Campaign Union order of battle.) Nash was severely wounded near the end of the war, at the Battle of Fort Blakely in Alabama, April 1865; he lost part of his leg.

After the war Nash was a businessman and was appointed night inspector of U.S. customs.

Nash was elected as a Republican to the Forty-fourth Congress (March 4, 1875 – March 3, 1877). He was unsuccessful as a candidate for reelection in 1876, as "Redeemer" Democrats regained control of Louisianan politics. He served briefly as postmaster at Washington in St. Landry Parish, Louisiana, during the Chester A. Arthur administration, only from February 15 to May 1, 1882.

Later life and death
Nash died in New Orleans at the age of sixty-nine. He was interred there in Saint Louis Cemetery No. 3.

See also
List of African-American United States representatives

References

Further reading

External links

1844 births
1913 deaths
People from Opelousas, Louisiana
African-American people in Louisiana politics
African-American members of the United States House of Representatives
American bricklayers
Louisiana postmasters
Republican Party members of the United States House of Representatives from Louisiana
19th-century American politicians
Union Army soldiers
African-American politicians during the Reconstruction Era
20th-century African-American people